Palo amarillo is a common name of Spanish origin for several plants and may refer to:

 Bocconia frutescens
 
 
 Mahonia gracilis, native to Mexico
 Terminalia australis, native to South America